Yogesh Kumar Tyagi  is an Indian academic. He is the 22nd Vice Chancellor of University of Delhi. He was former Dean of Faculty of legal studies, South Asian University and is credited with the establishment of an excellent department for International Law. He has published a famous work on UN Human Rights Committee(Cambridge University Press). He has published extensively in International journals.

Education

He completed his LLM from the Columbia University School of Law in New York, where he was a Silver Fellow, and obtained his MPhil and PhD  from Jawaharlal Nehru University (JNU), New Delhi.

Career

He is on leave from his position of Professor of International Law at Jawaharlal Nehru University. He is also a Member of the l’Institut de Droit International. He has also served as a Member, Law Commission of India.

References

Living people
Year of birth missing (living people)
Academic staff of Delhi University
Columbia Law School alumni
Jawaharlal Nehru University alumni
Academic staff of Jawaharlal Nehru University
International law scholars